After achieving independence from the Soviet Union, the Republic of Moldova established relations with other European countries. A course for European Union integration and neutrality define the country's foreign policy guidelines.

In 1995, the country became the first post-Soviet state admitted to the Council of Europe. In addition to its participation in NATO's Partnership for Peace program, Moldova is a member state of the United Nations, the Organization for Security and Co-operation in Europe (OSCE), the North Atlantic Cooperation Council, the World Trade Organization, the International Monetary Fund, the World Bank, the Francophonie and the European Bank for Reconstruction and Development.

In 2005, Moldova and EU established an action plan that sought to improve the collaboration between the two neighboring structures. After the Transnistria War, Moldova sought a peaceful resolution to the Transnistria conflict by working with Romania, Ukraine, and Russia, calling for international mediation, and cooperating with the OSCE and UN fact-finding and observer missions.

Overview

Moldova has established diplomatic relations with 153 UN member states, the Holy See, the Sovereign Military Order of Malta and the European Union.

Moldova has not yet established diplomatic relations with the following UN countries:
Honduras, Trinidad and Tobago
Botswana, Central African Republic, Chad, Comoros, Côte d'Ivoire, Democratic Republic of the Congo, Equatorial Guinea, Eritrea, Gabon, Guinea-Bissau, Lesotho, Liberia, Malawi, Namibia, Niger, Nigeria, Republic of the Congo, São Tomé and Príncipe, Seychelles, Somalia, South Sudan, Tanzania, Togo
Bhutan, Iraq, Myanmar
Kiribati, Marshall Islands, Federated States of Micronesia, Nauru, Papua New Guinea, Timor-Leste, Tonga, Vanuatu

Relations with the European Union

Moldova aspires to join the European Union and is implementing its first three-year Action Plan within the framework of the European Neighbourhood Policy (ENP) of the EU.

As regards energy policy, Moldova was an observer to the treaty establishing Energy Community from the outset (2006). Following its interest in full membership, the European Commission was mandated to carry out negotiations with Moldova in 2007. In December 2009, the Energy Community Ministerial Council decided on the accession, but made it conditional to amendment of Moldova's gas law. Moldova joined the Energy Community as a full-fledged member in March 2010.

Relations with NATO

NATO relations with Moldova date back to 1992, when the country joined the North Atlantic Cooperation Council. Moldova works alongside NATO allies and partner countries in a wide range of areas through the Partnership for Peace and the Euro-Atlantic Partnership Council.

Relations with post-Soviet states
The Moldovan Parliament approved the country's membership in the Commonwealth of Independent States and the CIS charter on economic union in April 1994. Moldova however has never participated in any military aspects of CIS, citing its neutrality status.

In 1998, Moldova contributed to the founding of GUAM, a regional cooperation agreement made up of Georgia, Ukraine, Azerbaijan and Moldova. Although the agreement initially included a declaration of mutual defense, Moldova has since declared its disinterest in participating in any GUAM-based mutual defense initiative.

Russia continues to maintain a military presence in the Transnistrian region of Moldova, despite previous agreements with Moldova and within OSCE and CAF to withdraw its troops and ammunition.

Moldova was granted Observer Status in the Russian-led Eurasian Union in April 2017.

Relations with Transnistria

The territory of Moldova includes the separatist Transnistria region. Transnistria had a particularly large non-Moldovan population (about 60%) and broke away from Moldova less than a year after Moldova became independent at the fall of the Soviet Union. The Pridnestrovian Moldavian Republic controls main part of this region, and also the city of Bender and its surrounding localities on the west bank. The international diplomatic situation with respect to the question of Transnistria determines and is determined by Moldova's relations with Russia. Russia, Ukraine, Organization for Security and Co-operation in Europe, EU, and United States are involved at different degrees in the conflict resolution.

Bilateral relations

Multilateral

Africa

Americas

Asia

Europe

Oceania

See also
List of diplomatic missions in Moldova
List of diplomatic missions of Moldova
List of Ambassadors to Moldova

Gallery

References

External links
 Moldovan Ministry of Foreign Affairs

Further reading
 Baltag, Dorina. "EU external representation post-Lisbon: the performance of EU diplomacy in Belarus, Moldova and Ukraine." The Hague Journal of Diplomacy 13.1 (2018): 75-96. online
 Baltag, Dorina. "Practice and performance: EU diplomacy in Moldova, Ukraine and Belarus after the inauguration of the European External Action Service, 2010–2015" (Diss. Loughborough University, 2018.) online
 Cozma, Artur. "The Diplomacy of the Republic of Moldova during 1944-2001." (2007). online 
 Del Medico, Nicola. "A Black Knight in the Eastern Neighbourhood? Russia and EU Democracy Promotion in Armenia and Moldova." (EU Diplomacy Paper No. 7) (2014). online
 Ejova, Cristina, and Anastasia Eșanu. "Public diplomacy of the European Union and its reflection in the Republic of Moldova." Moldoscopie 92.1 (2021): 43-53. online
 Löwenhardt, John. "The OSCE, Moldova and Russian diplomacy in 2003." Journal of Communist Studies and Transition Politics 20.4 (2004): 103-112.